Presidential elections were held in the Republic of Montenegro on 22 December 2002.

Background
The elections were boycotted by the opposition Socialist People's Party, who accused the ruling Democratic Party of Socialists of pressurising civil servants to vote for Vujanović. The elections were also overshadowed by the arrest of Deputy State Attorney Zoran Piperović for connections with human trafficking and forced prostitution.

Results
Although Dragan Hajduković was a member of the Greens of Montenegro, he ran as an independent.

Aftermath
Although Filip Vujanović won the election with 86% of the vote, turnout was less than the required 50%, so the election was declared invalid. Fresh elections were held in February 2003, which were also invalidated, and then again in May when the turnout rule was abolished.

References
 

Presidential elections in Montenegro
Montenegro
Presidential
Elections in Serbia and Montenegro
Montenegro